Cleveland Municipal Airport  is a public use airport in Pawnee County, Oklahoma, United States. It is owned by the City of Cleveland and located two nautical miles (4 km) south of its central business district. This airport is included in the National Plan of Integrated Airport Systems for 2011–2015, which categorized it as a general aviation facility.

Facilities and aircraft 
Cleveland Municipal Airport covers an area of 172 acres (70 ha) at an elevation of 912 feet (278 m) above mean sea level. It has one runway designated 18/36 with an asphalt surface measuring 4,000 by 60 feet (1,219 x 18 m).

For the 12-month period ending May 15, 2009, the airport had 1,600 aircraft operations, an average of 133 per month: 94% general aviation and 6% military. At that time there were five aircraft single-engine based at this airport.

See also 
 List of airports in Oklahoma

References

External links 
 Aerial image from USGS The National Map
 

Airports in Oklahoma
Buildings and structures in Pawnee County, Oklahoma
Transportation in Pawnee County, Oklahoma